Herkimer Home State Historic Site is a historic house museum in Herkimer County, New York, United States. Herkimer Home is in the north part of the Town of Danube, south of the Mohawk River.

The home was built in 1764 by Nicholas Herkimer, who died there in 1777 from wounds suffered in the Battle of Oriskany. He is also buried there.  In 1834, the house was owned by Nicholas Herkimer's nephew, John Herkimer.

Services and activities 

The site offers a picnic area, scenic views, a visitor center, tours, re-enactments, gardens, and hiking.

Attempted closure 
In 2010, Democratic Governor David Paterson attempted to close the park due to budget cuts.  Opposition to the closure was strong, and the park remained open.

See also 
 List of New York State Historic Sites

References

External links 

 
  Herkimer Home State Historic Site (Official site), at NYS OPRHP
  Herkimer Home information
 Herkimer Home, Danube, New York, in LandmarkSociety.org book

Houses on the National Register of Historic Places in New York (state)
New York (state) historic sites
Museums in Herkimer County, New York
Historic house museums in New York (state)
Houses in Herkimer County, New York
Parks in Herkimer County, New York
Houses completed in 1764
1764 establishments in the Province of New York
National Register of Historic Places in Herkimer County, New York